Semih Tezcan (born May 3, 1932) is a Turkish academic. He graduated from Istanbul Technical University Faculty of Civil engineering in 1954. In 1962, he went to Canada, and joined University of British Columbia as an assistant professor.

Tezcan became Associate Professor in 1964, and Professor in 1966 at UBC. He received the Gzowski Gold Medal, Best Civil Engineering Paper Award from Engineering Institute of Canada. He was the founding president of the Turkish Canadian Society from 1963 to 1968.

He became the second president of Boğaziçi University, succeeding the first president Dr. Aptullah Kuran,  (former American Robert College in İstanbul) where he served between 1979 and 1982. Tezcan was the President of YÖK (Yükseköğretim Kurulu) between 1980 and 1981. In addition to his academic career in Boğaziçi University, Tezcan is currently the President of Higher Education and Research Foundation, and the President of Türkiye Deprem Vakfı (TDV). Tezcan has also served many years as the Honorary Consul-General of Indonesia in Istanbul from August 1985 to February 2008.

Semih Tezcan has been married to Özlem Tezcan since August 15, 1984, and they have two sons.

References 
 
https://www.youtube.com/watch?v=QYFWc7NBta4

Turkish non-fiction writers
Turkish engineering academics
Turkish civil engineers
1932 births
Living people
Istanbul Technical University alumni
Robert College alumni
Turkish emigrants to Canada
Academic staff of Boğaziçi University
Academic staff of the University of British Columbia
Rectors of Boğaziçi University